Coringasuchus is a genus of mesoeucrocodylian crocodyliform, perhaps a notosuchian.  It is known from fossils including cranial material discovered in rocks of the early Cenomanian-age Upper Cretaceous Alcântara Formation, Cajual Island, northeastern Brazil.  Coringasuchus was described by Alexander Kellner and colleagues in 2009. The type species is C. anisodontis.

References 

Ziphosuchians
Terrestrial crocodylomorphs
Cenomanian life
Late Cretaceous crocodylomorphs of South America
Cretaceous Brazil
Fossils of Brazil
Fossil taxa described in 2009
Taxa named by Alexander Kellner
Prehistoric pseudosuchian genera